Ługi Górzyckie  is a village in the administrative district of Gmina Górzyca, within Słubice County, Lubusz Voivodeship, in western Poland, close to the German border.

The village has a population of 140.

References

Villages in Słubice County